The Adam Tablet is a tablet computer designed by Bangalore-based firm Notion Ink Design Labs. The worldwide launch occurred on December 18, 2010 via a video released by Notion Ink detailing their Eden Interface.  On December 9 a limited number of devices were released for pre-order globally, followed by a larger pre-order starting January 9, 2011 and an open subscription pre-order from 11 January 2011. The Adam runs a customized version of Android 2.2 Froyo, and has released beta versions of Android 3.0 Honeycomb and Android 4.0 Ice Cream Sandwich The beta versions released were largely done through the efforts of volunteer developers. The Adam is set to be the first Android device marketed to contain Pixel Qi's low-power, dual-mode display. The device is one of several tablet form-factor devices to include a dual-core Nvidia Tegra 2 processor that can support 1080p video output mirroring.

The Adam was shown at the 2011 Consumer Electronics Show (CES) in Las Vegas where it received favorable initial reviews.

Features
The Adam includes an Nvidia Tegra 250 processor with a 1 GHz Dual Core Cortex A9. Running Android 2.2 Froyo, the Adam incorporates a Notion Ink created overlay interface, called Eden, which is forward compatible; it incorporates modules from the successor to Android 2.3 Gingerbread. Rohan Shravan, CEO of Notion Ink, has stated that his company is currently working on porting Android 3.0, Honeycomb to the product.

The Notion Ink Design Labs Adam has two choices of screen, a transflective liquid crystal display made by Pixel Qi or a backlit liquid crystal display (LCD). Both screen choices are  diagonal with a resolution of 1024x600. The device measures  and weighs .

A 185° swivel-camera can face a user during video chatting at -5°, can face a live lecture or meeting while the unit is on a table at 90°, or can snap photographs at 180°.  The camera does not work on the beta version for Ice Cream Sandwich.

The Adam can be plugged into a high-definition television (HDTV) through a high-definition multimedia interface (HDMI) port.

The Adam's USB ports are enabled in host mode which allows the connection of USB flash drives and hard drives. This feature also can be used to connect a keyboard and a mouse to the Adam.

The Adam was supposed to come bundled with Adobe Flash but the first shipped devices did not have it pre-installed. However, Adam owners were able to sideload a Tegra 2-optimized version of Adobe Flash with no problems. It is expected to support Adobe AIR when it launches. The Tegra 250's supports flash acceleration.

Controversy
The Notion Ink Adam was beset by a number of controversies and delays since its preorder launch in December 2010. These included shipping problems, confusion over the specifications of the machine, reportedly poor customer support and questionable build quality.

The first units shipped were subject to an OTA  updating error in which the update file failed to completely download to the device (i.e. a product of the distribution system, not one of the content of the update), which resulted in the device becoming inoperable. As a result of communication between Notion Ink support and numerous community forum commenters, a fixed update was provided by Notion Ink to rectify the problem, in the form of an 80MB download. Many customers also questioned the gap between the quality of the screen and Notion Ink's advertised 'pure-matte glass', as the screen still had a glossy effect. Answering this criticism, Rohan Shravan described the screen as having 2 internal layers of matte surfaces; for the external glass, the gloss was to be corrected with a customer-applied matte screen protector.

The Adam also shipped without a number of promised or fully functioning applications - included in those missing were the company's own Genesis market and the comic-book reader, Longbox. , it was unclear if these applications would make it to consumers.

In late January 2011, leaked photographs supposedly taken during US Federal Communications Commission (FCC) inspections created a fresh round of criticism, with commentators remarking on the inferiority of the build to established brands, with respect in particular to hand soldered wires and components. In the official Notion Ink blog, CEO Rohan Shravan defended the Adam's build quality as a product of a start-up company and stating that the wires are solid and belong to the antenna.

Hardware
Size and weight
 Thickness: 
 Width: 
 Length: 
 Weight: 
System on chip:
 Nvidia Tegra 250
 1 GHz Dual Core Cortex A-9
 Nvidia Geforce  ULP GPU
Memory and storage:
 1 GB DDR2
 1 GB SLC
 8 GB flash, more variants may be coming at some time
Power and battery:
 Universal Charger
 3 cell 24.6Whr removable battery
Display:
  WSVGA (1024 × 600)
 Optional Pixel Qi display:
 Transmissive
 Transflective
 Reflective
 Multi-touch
 Screen protector with matte finish
 Anti glare coating
 Scratch resistant
 Finger print resistant
Camera
 185° Swivel Camera (3.2 MP) (720p)
Communication
 WLAN - 802.11 b/g/n
 Bluetooth 2.1 + EDR
 WWAN - 3G HSPA (850 MHz and 1900 MHz) or (900 MHz and 2100 MHz)
 FM radio
Audio
 Stereo loudspeakers
 3.5-mm headphone/microphone jack
 Built-in microphone
Input/output ports:
 USB 2.0 Host x 2,
 Mini USB
 HDMI
 microSD slot
 Subscriber Identity Module (SIM) card slot; 3g model only
 DC connector
Sensors
 3-axis accelerometer
 Ambient light sensor
 GPS
 Digital compass

Software
The new unit will come with a customized version of Android 2.2 Froyo operating system known as Eden which includes many features of Android 2.3 Gingerbread. It was originally planned to be able to support ChromeOS and Ubuntu but no working build of either has been created for the Adam. The Android Market was to be implemented in late May upon release of Android 3.0 Honeycomb, but these plans were dropped. Notion Ink had also announced their own application marketplace, named Genesis, but this was never opened. They announced $1 million in prize funds for developers, as per their older website, but plans were canceled due to budget issues.
Email client  (Mail’d)
Office suite (QuickOffice)
File browser (Sniffer)
Calendar
WebKit browser 
Weather
Music
Navigation and maps
E-Reader
Paint (Canvas) 
Longbox Comic E-Reader
Photo editor
Calculator
Video
Camera
Contacts
Settings
Sound recorder
Clock
Search
Speech recognition
Gallery
In May 2011, Notion Ink Announced that the Adam will be shipping with Android 2.2 Froyo, Eden 1.5, an Amazon Kindle App, and the Dolphin Browser HD. Android 3 Honeycomb support is expected to arrive before the end of June.

Future of NotionInk
NotionInk later went on to release other devices with latest hardware, most notably the Adam II, and Cain 2-in-1. Despite the Adam misstep, NotionInk has managed to survive 7 years, since its inception on July 26, 2016.

See also
Comparison of tablet computers
Tablet computer
List of Android devices

References

https://techcrunch.com/2013/02/18/the-agony-of-the-fanboy/

External links

Notion Ink, Blog by Rohan Shravan, company founder
 http://www.lightreading.in/document.asp?doc_id=220713
 Unofficial Android ports (both KK and Lollipop): http://www.tabletroms.com/forums/adam-rom-development/

Android (operating system) devices
Tablet computers
Tablet computers introduced in 2011